Bhagat Ki Kothi is a place in Rajasthan, near Jodhpur. Bhagat Ki Kothi is famous for the Thar Express. This station connects India and Karachi, Pakistan.
It is also famous for the Taj Hotel and the Lahariya Sweet Home.

Bhagat Ki Kothi is home to one of the largest diesel locomotive sheds of western India. In railway communications it is abbreviated as BGKT.

Jodhpur